MMMBop is a demo album by American pop rock group Hanson, released in 1996 independently after Boomerang. It contains a few tracks that were later re-recorded for their debut studio album Middle of Nowhere.

Track listing
All songs written by Isaac Hanson, Taylor Hanson and Zachary Hanson.
 "Day Has Come" – 4:51
 "Thinking of You" – 3:15
 "Two Tears" – 2:44
 "Stories" – 2:37
 "River" – 3:50
 "Surely as the Sun" – 5:43
 "Something New" – 2:44
 "MMMBop" – 3:54
 "Soldier" – 6:16
 "Pictures" – 2:18
 "Incredible" – 4:22
 "With You in Your Dreams" – 4:17
 "Sometimes" – 4:28
 "Baby (You're So Fine)" – 3:22
 "MMMBop" (long version) – 5:07

References

Hanson (band) albums
1996 albums
Demo albums
Self-released albums